Woodbury or Woodberry, is a historic mansion located near Leetown, Jefferson County, West Virginia.  It was built in 1834-1835 for the jurist and Congressman Henry St. George Tucker, Sr. (1780–1848). Tucker lived at Woodbury from its construction until 1844.

Description
Woodbury is  stories tall and is built of stone, faced with white plaster in a Regency period style. At  and 22 rooms, it is an unusually large house.  The front facade features a flat-roofed center portico supported by four plain columns in front and two engaged columns in the rear. The five-bay elevation is raised above a particularly high raised basement. The end elevations have prominent stepped parapets incorporating the chimneys. The interior plan features a long transverse hall with a curved stairway at one end. A false window was provided at the right side of the first floor to deal with the stair crossing the window. The basement has a dining room, an unusual feature, and the attic was finished when built. A formal porch with paired columns is located on the entrance side, approached by a broad stairway. On the rear a porch extends across most of the width of the house, with stairs at each end.

It was listed on the National Register of Historic Places in 1974.

References

External links

Houses on the National Register of Historic Places in West Virginia
Historic American Buildings Survey in West Virginia
Houses in Jefferson County, West Virginia
Houses completed in 1834
Federal architecture in West Virginia
National Register of Historic Places in Jefferson County, West Virginia
Tucker family residences